Schizocytheridae is a family of crustaceans belonging to the order Ostracoda.

Genera:
 Acuminocythere Swain & Gilby, 1974
 Amphicytherura Butler & Jones, 1957
 Apateloschizocythere Bate, 1972
 Neomonoceratina Kingma, 1948
 Paraschizocythere
 Spinoceratin  Mostafawi, 1992

References

Ostracods